Roberto Alejandro Avellanet Negrón, known professionally as Robert Avellanet or Roba, is a Puerto Rican singer, songwriter, actor and music producer who was a member of Menudo. Avellanet's uncle is the famous Puerto Rican singer Chucho Avellanet.

Biography
Avellanet was born in San Juan, Puerto Rico were he became a teen idol across Latin America after being hired by Edgardo Diaz as a member of Menudo in 1988, alongside Ricky Martin . He joined the group during the era popularly known as Menudo's Rock era.

Avellanet's CD debut came when Menudo recorded Sombras & Figuras, title of an album that produced hits for the group. Then came Los Ultimos Heroes, which was released in Portuguese as Os Ultimos Herois, and No Me Corten El Pelo.

Almost immediately after becoming a former Menudo in 1991, Robert and ex-bandmate and friend Rawy Torres formed a group named Euphoria during the early 1990s and recorded two albums; Euphoria and Toma Mi Corazón.

In 1994 Avellanet went to college at the University of Puerto Rico to study advertising.  In 1996 tropical music producer and business executive, Ralph Mercado, signed Robert to record a salsa album under the RMM label with the distribution of Universal Music.  The album Sentir (1999), produced by Isidro Infante, had success in several Latin American countries, and in New York and Puerto Rico.  The album was promoted by its lead single, "Miente", a cover of Enrique Iglesias's song which became a top-ten hit on the Billboard Tropical Airplay chart.

In 2002 Robert moved to Miami to pursue new challenges as an artist.  He became a well known soap opera actor working for networks such as Univision, Telemundo and Venevision Productions. Avellanet has also been in several theatrical plays, such as Quién Mato a Hector Lavoe, The Sleeping Beauty, Cuatro XXXX and Descarados.

In 2003 Avellanet and his former Menudo bandmates (Sergio, Ruben, Angelo and Rawy) made a reunion tour, naming it Los Ultimos Heroes. They performed in Puerto Rico and Venezuela.

In 2009 Avellanet co-produced the pop rock album titled Jet Privado,  featuring songs such as Jet Privado, Laberinto, No Te Arrepientas and Miserable.  Jet Privado includes collaborations from venezuelan producer and songwriter Frank Santofimio, colombian producer/engineer Andres Saavedra and venezuelan songwriter/producer Juan Carlos Perez Soto.

Jet Privado was released digitally around the globe on January 20, 2009.

In 2011 Robert moved to Los Angeles, California to persue a career in acting and throughout the next decade he worked in several tv series, films and commercials, and also released several music singles.

In 2014 he released his first album in English, Heart and Soul, 10 songs with influences of soul, jazz and pop rock.  It was produced by Fernando Perdomo and co-produced by Robert himself.  It features songs like When I Have You, Love Is A Journey and Shine Your Light. 

During 2015, Avellanet joined fellow former Menudo members Miguel Cancel, Ray Reyes, Rene Farrait and Charlie Masso in a tour throughout Latin America and United States, once again using the name Menudo.  Right after this, he also participated in the Menudomania Forever tour, where Menudo's 40th anniversary was celebrated by bringing together a large number of former members. They performed in Miami, Florida, and in several cities of Mexico.

Robert's latest feature film Free Dead Or Alive, streamed on Prime Video on August 8, 2022.  There he portrays the son of a drug lord in a leading role. He also wrote and recorded the theme song Comenzar de Nuevo; which is dedicated to immigrants.  The film was distributed by 1091 Pictures and Cinema Black.

Also in 2022 Robert founded Viva La Earth, a skin cream company that supports non-profit organizations, such as The Wayuu Taya Foundation.  In the same year, Robert was part of the documentary Menudo Forever Young, "the chroncles of the rise and fall of the most iconic Latin American boy band", where he gave his testimony of his time in Menudo. It was directed by Angel Manuel Soto, and premiered at the Tribeca Film Festival, then released for streaming on HBO Max on June 23, 2022.

Robert's latest music single The Dog Song (The Best of All) is a trbute to dogs and it was released on February 14, 2023. He also produced and co-directed the music video that was released on youtube on the same day.

Discography

With Menudo 
 Sombras y Figuras (1988)
 Los Ultimos Heroes (1989)
 Os Ultimos Heroes (1990)
 No Me Corten El Pelo (1990)

With Euphoria 
 Euphoria (1992)
 Toma Mi Corazón (1994)

Solo Albums 
Sentir (1999)
Jet Privado (as Roba)(2009)
Jet Privado - Edición Especial (2014)
Heart & Soul (2014)

Singles 
Cuando Tu Bailas (2017)
Menudo - with Big Venti and DJ Calvin (2022)
Comenzar de Nuevo - (from the soundtrack of Free Dead Or Alive) (2023)
The Dog Song (The Best of All) (2023)

See also
List of Puerto Ricans

References

External links
 
 Robert Avellanet, YouTube
 Robert Avellanet, Instagram
 Robert Avellanet, Facebook
 Robert Avellanet, Twitter

 

1975 births
Living people
Menudo (band) members
20th-century Puerto Rican male singers
People from San Juan, Puerto Rico
21st-century American male singers
21st-century American singers
Puerto Rican people of Italian descent